The following is a list of islands found within New York State.

Alder Island
Alger Island
Association Island
Barnum Island
Beeren Island
Big Crow Island
Big Hassock Island
Bird Island
Black Banks Island
Broad Channel Island
Brother Island
Calumet Island
Captree Island
Carleton Island
Catwright Island
Cayuga Island
Cedar Island
Cedar Island (Babylon)
Cedar Island (Shelter Island)
Cedar Island (Nassau County)
Center Island
Cinder Island
City Island
Clifford Island
Colonels Island, New York
Columbia Island
Coney Island
Constellation Rock
Constitution Island
Crab Island (Lake Champlain)
Crab Island (Long Island Sound)
Croil Island
Croyle Island
Cuba Island
Dark Island
Davids Island
Dayton Island
Deer Island
Deowongo Island
Dosoris Island
Duck Island
East Island (Long Island Sound)
East Island (Hempstead, New York)
East Aler Island
East Channel Island
East Crow Island
East Fire Island
Echo Island
Egg Island
Elder Island
Ellis Island
Eatons Neck
Fire Island
Fish Island
Flat Rock Island
Fishers Island
Frenchman Island
Galloo Island
Galop Island
Gardiners Island
Gardiners Point
Gatamby Rock
Georges Island
Gilgo Island
Glen Island
Goat Island
Goose Island (Bronx, New York)
Goose Island (New Rochelle, New York)
Governors Island
Grand Island 
Grass Island
Great Island
Great Gull Island
Green Island
Grenadier Island
Harrison Island
Hart Island
Hen Island
Hewlett Hassock
Hicks Island
High Island
Hoffman Island
Hog Island
Hospital Island
Howland Island (Montezuma WMA)
Huckleberry Island
Ingraham Hassock Island
Indian Island (Bay Shore West)
Indian Island (Mattituck)
Iona Island
Ironsides Island
Islands of the Bronx
Isle of Meadows
Jeckyl Island
John Boyle Island
Jones Island
Jones Beach Island
Lanes Island
Liberty Island
Little Cedar Island
Little Galloo Island
Little Goose Island
Little Gull Island
Little Island
Little Ram Island
Long Beach Island
Long Island
Long Meadow Island
Low Island
Luna Island
Manhattan Island
Manursing Island
Meadow Island
Meadowmere Park Island
Middle Crow Island
Middle Line Island
Mill Rock
Money Island
Murray Isle
Neptune Island
New Made Island
Nezeras Island
Nicoll Island
North Black Banks Hassock Island
North Brother Island
North Cinder Island
North Dumpling Island
North Line Island
North Manursing Island
North Meadow Island
Oak Island (Bay Shore West)
Oak Island (New Rochelle) (in Premium Mill-Pond)
Olivers Island
Oscawana Island
Outer Barrier Islands
Paradise Island
Parsonage Island
Pattersquash Island
Pearsalis Hassock
Pelican Island
Penny Island
Pine Island
Pea Island
Plum Island
Pollopel Island
Prall's Island
Ram Island
Randalls and Wards Islands (joined)
Rat Island
Reedy Island
Ridge Island
Rikers Island
Robins Island
Rock Island
Ruffle Bar
Roosevelt Island
Sand City Island
Sanford Island
Schodack Island
Schuyler Island
Sea Dog Island
Seamans Island
Sedge Island (Gardiners Island West)
Sedge Island (New Rochelle)
Sedge Island (Quogue)
Seganus Thatch Island
Sexton Island
Shelter Island
Shoofly Island
Shooters Island
Short Beach Island
Simmons Hassock
Snipe Island
South Black Banks Hassock
South Brother Island
South Dumpling Island
South Line Island
Star Island
Staten Island
Strawberry Island
Squaw Island (Canandaigua Lake) 
Swinburne Island
Tank Island
Thatch Island
The Hassock
Throggs Neck
Three Cornered Hassock
Thousand Islands
Three Sisters Islands
Townsend Island
Travers Island
U Thant Island (Belmont Island)
Unity Island (formerly known as Squaw Island [Buffalo])
Valcour Island
Valiant Rock
Van Rensselaer Island
Van Schaick Island
Wansers Island
Warner Island
West Island
West Crow Island
West Fire Island
Westhampton Island
Wicopesset Island
Wood Tick Island
Wreck Island
Wright Island
Wellesley Island
Youngs Island

See also
List of smaller islands in New York City

Islands
New York